Palecek is a surname. Notable people with the surname include:

David Palecek (1972–2010), American management consultant
Emil Paleček (1930–2018), Czech biochemist
Jeremiah Palecek (born 1984), American artist
Josef Paleček (born 1949), Czech ice hockey player and coach